Ceres was launched at Bermuda in 1800, or 1802. She came to Liverpool in 1806 and commenced a voyage as a slave ship. She was wrecked in late 1806 or early 1807 as she was leaving Africa for the West Indies, unfortunately with a full cargo of slaves, all of whom apparently were lost.

Career
Ceres was first listed in Lloyd's Register (LR) in 1806 with Mortimore, master, S. Newton & Co., owners, and trade Liverpool–Africa.

Captain John Mortimer sailed from Liverpool on 7 January 1801, bound for the area between Rio Nuñez and the Assini River. She had a crew of 26 men.

Lloyd's List reported on 14 January 1806 that Ceres, Mortimer, master, "from Africa", was on shore near Liverpool and was reportedly a total loss. Some two weeks later Lloyd's List reported that Ceres, Mortimer, master, which had gotten on shore while sailing from Liverpool to Africa, had been gotten off and had returned to Liverpool.

Ceres, Mortimer, master, set out again, but on 10 March she was among the vessels that a violent gale drove ashore as they were outward bound from Liverpool. Several of these vessels, Ceres among them, were got off and brought back to dock in Liverpool as they had been damaged.

At some point John Williams became Ceress captain. On 6 August Ceres, of Liverpool, Williams, master, arrived off the Windward Coast of Africa.

Loss
Lloyd's List reported on 20 March 1807 that Ceres, of Liverpool, Williams, master, had capsized off Cape Mesurado. She was bound for the West Indies with a full cargo. Thirteen of her crew were saved.

Citations

1800s ships
1802 ships
Ships built in Bermuda
Age of Sail merchant ships of England
Liverpool slave ships
Maritime incidents in 1806
Maritime incidents in 1807
Shipwrecks of Africa
Shipwrecks in the Atlantic Ocean
Shipwrecks of England
Shipwrecks in the Irish Sea